Ambloplites is a genus of North American freshwater fish in the sunfish family (Centrarchidae) of order Perciformes. The type species is A. rupestris, the rock bass, and the species of this genus are known collectively as the rock basses.

Etymology 

The generic name Ambloplites derives from the Greek αμβλύς (blunt) and οπλίτης (bearing a shield).

Species
The currently recognized species in this genus are:
 Ambloplites ariommus Viosca, 1936 (shadow bass)
 Ambloplites cavifrons Cope, 1868 (Roanoke bass)
 Ambloplites constellatus Cashner & Suttkus, 1977 (Ozark bass)
 Ambloplites rupestris (Rafinesque, 1817) (rock bass)

References
 

 
Centrarchinae
Extant Miocene first appearances
Taxa named by Constantine Samuel Rafinesque